The electoral district of Shepparton is a rural Lower House electoral district of the Victorian Parliament. It is located within the Northern Victoria Region of the Legislative Council.

The electoral district of Shepparton covers an area of 3,289 square kilometres.

Shepparton includes the country towns of Ardmona, Barmah, Congupna, Dookie, Katunga, Kialla, Mooroopna, Nathalia, Picola, Shepparton, Strathmerton, Tallygaroopna, Tatura and Toolamba. The district also includes the Barmah National Park.

It is a rich agricultural area with orchards, vineyards and dairy farms. Much of the electorate is an important irrigation area served by water from the Main East Goulburn Channel. The rest of the land is used for pasture, fodder crops and cattle and sheep grazing.

Shepparton was held by the National/Country Party from its creation in 1945 until 2014, although it was abolished for a twelve-year period between 1955 and 1967. The current member is National Kim O'Keeffe, who was elected at the 2022 state election, defeating Independent Suzanna Sheed, who was elected in the 2014 election.

Members for Shepparton

Election results

References

External links
 Electorate profile: Shepparton District, Victorian Electoral Commission

Electoral districts of Victoria (Australia)
1945 establishments in Australia
1955 disestablishments in Australia
1967 establishments in Australia
Shepparton
Shire of Moira